This is a list of archives in Azerbaijan.

Archives 

 State Archives of the Republic of Azerbaijan (az)
 Archive of Political Documents of the Office of the President of Azerbaijan (az)
 State Archives of Political Parties and Public Movements of the Republic of Azerbaijan (az)
 State Archives of Scientific and Technical Documents of the Republic of Azerbaijan (az)
 State Archives of Literature and Art of the Republic of Azerbaijan (az)
 State Archives of Cinematographic Documents of the Republic of Azerbaijan (az)
 State Archives of Sound Recordings of the Republic of Azerbaijan (az)
 State Historical Archives of the Republic of Azerbaijan (az)
 State Archives of the Nakhchivan Autonomous Republic (az)

See also 
 National Archive Department of Azerbaijan
 List of archives
 List of libraries in Azerbaijan
 List of museums in Azerbaijan
 Culture of Azerbaijan

References

External links 
 List of archives of state bodies and organizations in Azerbaijan 

Archives

Archives in Azerbaijan
Azerbaijan
Archives